Bob Kroll may refer to:

 Bob Kroll (American football) (born 1950), defensive back with the Green Bay Packers
 Bob Kroll (police officer) (born ), former president of the Police Officers Federation of Minneapolis

See also
 Robert Henderson Croll